Italianamerican  is a 1974 American documentary film directed by Martin Scorsese and featuring his parents Catherine and Charles, who reflect on their experiences as the children of Italian immigrants to New York City.

Synopsis
Over dinner at their New York apartment on Elizabeth Street, Martin engages his parents in a lively and candid discussion about their lives, discussing such topics as their upbringing, family, religion, marriage, their Italian ancestors, post-war life in Italy, and the hardships of poor Sicilian immigrants striving to succeed in America. Catherine also demonstrates her technique for cooking meatballs, a recipe later printed in the end credits of the film.

Reception
Italianamerican was received positively after its screening at the 1974 New York Film Festival, with the New York Daily News reporting the film "completely charmed" the "usually blase festival audience."

Home video
On May 26, 2020, the Criterion Collection released Scorsese Shorts, a compilation of five early short films directed by Scorsese: Italianamerican, American Boy: A Profile of Steven Prince, What's a Nice Girl Like You Doing in a Place Like This? and It's Not Just You, Murray!

See also
 List of American films of 1974

References

External links

1974 films
American documentary films
1974 documentary films
Documentary films about Italian-American culture
Documentary films about Sicily
Short films directed by Martin Scorsese
Films about New York City
Films about immigration to the United States
1970s English-language films
1970s American films